Our Daily Bread, usually an allusion to the phrase "Give us this day our daily bread" from the Lord's Prayer, may also refer to:

Films
Our Daily Bread (1926 film), a German silent drama film
Our Daily Bread (1929 film), or The Shadow of a Mine, a silent German film
Our Daily Bread (1934 film), an American drama film
Our Daily Bread (1949 film), an East German film 
Our Daily Bread (2005 film), a documentary film

Other uses
 Our Daily Bread (devotional), a devotional calendar-style booklet published by Our Daily Bread Ministries 
 Nuestro Pan Diario, the Spanish-language version
Our Daily Bread (painting), 1886 watercolour by Anders Zorn

See also
 Epiousios, the word usually translated "daily" in the phrase
 
 Daily Bread (disambiguation)